The Autódromo Las Vizcachas is a motorsport racing located in Puente Alto, in the Santiago Metropolitan Region of Chile. It was opened on October 5, 1965 and was in operation for 41 years. In 2006, it was closed to give way to a real estate project close to the circuit, which implied the prohibition of the development of motor tests in the layout, but in 2012 races were held again.

References 

Las Vizcachas
Las Vizcachas